Leary Independent School District is a public school district based in Leary, Texas (USA).

The district has one school that serves students in grades pre-kindergarten through eight.

In 2009, the school district was rated "recognized" by the Texas Education Agency.

References

External links
Leary ISD

School districts in Bowie County, Texas